Peter Scheiffele (born 21 December 1969 in Berlin) is a German neurobiologist who conducts research at the Biozentrum of the University of Basel, Switzerland.

Life 
Peter Scheiffele studied biochemistry at the Freie Universität Berlin. In 1998 he graduated with his doctorate from the EMBL in Heidelberg and subsequently worked as a postdoc at the University of California, Berkeley, and the University of California in San Francisco. In 2001 he was appointed as an assistant professor in the Department of Physiology & Cellular Biophysics at Columbia University, New York, and conducted research in the field of neurobiology. Since 2008 Peter Scheiffele is a Professor of Cell and Developmental Biology at the Biozentrum of the University of Basel.

Work 
Scheiffele investigates the mechanisms in the formation of neuronal networks in the central nervous system. His focus is the formation of synapses. Peter Scheiffele discovered that the neuronal adhesion molecules neuroligin and neurexin play an important role in synapse formation. In his current work he is collaborating with a network of European researchers to uncover pathophysiology and treatment approaches for autism spectrum disorders.

Awards & honors 
2002 Alfred P. Sloan Research Fellow
2002 Searle Scholar Award
2004 John Merck Scholar Award
2005 Simons Foundation Young Investigator Award
2013 elected Member of the European Molecular Biology Organization (EMBO)
2014 Robert Bing Prize of the Swiss Academy of Medical Sciences

References

External links 
 Research Group Peter Scheiffele

Columbia University faculty
Free University of Berlin alumni
German neurologists
1969 births
Living people